Batoche was a provincial electoral district for the Legislative Assembly of Saskatchewan, Canada. It was located in north central Saskatchewan, and was one of the original 25 electoral districts formed when the province was created in 1905.  The electoral district was replaced before the next general election in 1908, and was redistributed into Duck Lake, Vonda, Hanley, Saskatoon County and Arm River. Prior to the creation of the province, the riding existed as an electoral district of the North-West Territories.

A new district of the same name was created in 2002.

Member of the Legislative Assembly

Election results

|-

|style="width: 150px"|Provincial Rights
|Jean Baptiste Boucher
|align="right"|117
|align="right"|14.82
|- bgcolor="white"
!align="left" colspan=3|Total
!align="right"|789
!align="right"|100.00
!align="right"|

See also
Electoral district (Canada)
List of Saskatchewan provincial electoral districts
List of Saskatchewan general elections
List of political parties in Saskatchewan

References
 Saskatchewan Archives Board: Saskatchewan Executive and Legislative Directory

Former provincial electoral districts of Saskatchewan
fr:Batoche (circonscription saskatchewanaise)